Vela 5A (also known Vela 9 and OPS 6909) was an American reconnaissance satellite to detect explosions and nuclear tests on land and in space. It was released together with  Vela 5B, OV5 5, OV5 6 and OV5 9.

Instruments
 2 optical bhangmeters observing the planet
 12 external X-ray detectors
 18 internal neutron and gamma-ray detectors

See also 
 Vela (satellite)

References 

1969 in spaceflight
Military space program of the United States